Strata is an album by the American jazz pianist Matthew Shipp, recorded in 1997 and released on the Swiss hatOLOGY label.

The album features the Horn Quartet, a chamber-jazz group without drums composed of Shipp and three members of the band Other Dimensions In Music: trumpeter Roy Campbell, multi-instrumentalist Daniel Carter and bassist William Parker. Two weeks before, Shipp played as guest on Other Dimensions In Music live album Time Is of the Essence Is Beyond Time.

Reception

In his review for AllMusic, Thom Jurek states: "It is a stunning work, really, that showcases Shipp at the height of his compositional and improvisational powers, and points the way to the flowering of his vast talent as an arranger as well." The Penguin Guide to Jazz wrote that "Campbell is a diehard free jazz man and he puts some warmth into the surroundings."

Track listing
All compositions by Matthew Shipp
 "Strata 1" – 0:47
 "Strata 2" – 1:23
 "Strata 3" – 7:45
 "Strata 4" – 3:18
 "Strata 5" – 7:05
 "Strata 6" – 3:33
 "Strata 7" – 5:36
 "Strata 8" – 5:30
 "Strata 9" – 5:43
 "Strata 10" – 5:20
 "Strata 11" – 4:18
 "Strata 12" – 6:41
 "Strata 13" – 0:59
 "Strata 14" – 0:50

Personnel
 Roy Campbell – trumpet, pocket trumpet
 Daniel Carter – alto sax, tenor sax, flute, trumpet
 William Parker – bass
 Matthew Shipp - piano

References

1998 albums
Matthew Shipp albums
Hathut Records albums